Józef Szewczyk (17 February 1950 – 19 May 1989) was a Polish football midfielder.

References

1950 births
1989 deaths
Polish footballers
Association football midfielders
Hutnik Nowa Huta players
Śląsk Wrocław players
Lech Poznań players
Ekstraklasa players
I liga players
II liga players
Poland international footballers
Polish expatriate footballers
Expatriate footballers in Turkey
Polish expatriate sportspeople in Turkey
Expatriate men's footballers in Denmark
Polish expatriate sportspeople in Denmark